Five Star Motel is the third studio album by Andy Stochansky, and Stochansky's first major label release

Track listing

Personnel
Andy Stochansky - vocals, acoustic guitars, piano, cymbals, glockenspiel, tambourine, cello
Ian LeFeuvre - acoustic, electric and slide guitars, guiro, Mellotron, drum loops, percussion, backing vocals
Tom Beckham - glockenspiel, keyboards, Hammond organ, Wurlitzer, woodwinds, vibraphone
Dennis Herring - guitars, keyboards
Les Cooper - guitars, backing vocals
Steve Kreklo - guitars
Mark Hill, Alisdair Jones - bass
Matt Chamberlain, Peter Von Althen - drums, percussion
Chris Bartos - cello, violin, viola
Davey Faragher - backing vocals

References

2002 albums
Andy Stochansky albums
RCA Records albums
Albums produced by Tom Rothrock
Albums produced by Dennis Herring